The 2007–08 GMHL season was the second season of the Greater Metro Junior A Hockey League (GMHL). The thirteen teams of the GMHL will play 42-game schedules.

February 2008, the top teams of the league played down for the Russell Cup, emblematic of the grand championship of the GMHL.  Since the GMHL is independent from Hockey Canada and the Canadian Junior Hockey League, this is where the GMHL's season ended.  The Bradford Rattlers won their second Russell cup in as many years beating the Innisfil Lakers 4-games-to-none.

Changes 
Deseronto Thunder become Deseronto Storm
League expands by six teams: Douro Dukes, Elliot Lake Bobcats, Espanola Kings, Innisfil Lakers, Tamworth Cyclones, Temiscaming Royals

Final standings
Note: GP = Games played; W = Wins; L = Losses; OTL = Overtime Losses; SL = Shootout Losses; GF = Goals For.

The top 5 teams (blue shaded rows) were given their choice of opponent from the bottom five (purple) or taking a first round bye.  Places 6 through 8 had to wait for decisions of the top 5 teams to determine playoff activity.

Teams listed on the official league website.

Standings listed on official league website.

2007-08 Russell Cup Playoffs

Due to the playoff draft, Innisfil, Richmond Hill and South Muskoka elected to take first round byes.

Playoff results are listed on the official league website.

Moscow Selects exhibition series
From late December 2007 until mid-January 2008 the best teams of the GMHL faced off against the all-star team of a Moscow-based Junior A league, this was supposed to be finished off with a game between the Moscow Selects and the GMHL All-Star team but Moscow cancelled this game.

Moscow Selects 7 - Innisfil Lakers 3
Moscow Selects 8 - Bradford Rattlers 4
Moscow Selects 9 - Elliot Lake Bobcats 2
Moscow Selects 7 - Richmond Hill Rams 4
Moscow Selects 5 - South Muskoka Shield 1
Moscow Selects 9 - Temiscaming Royals 3
Moscow Selects 7 - Deseronto Storm 1

Scoring leaders 
Note: GP = Games played; G = Goals; A = Assists; Pts = Points; PIM = Penalty Minutes

Leading goaltenders 
Note: GP = Games played; Mins = Minutes Played; W = Wins; L = Losses: OTL = Overtime Losses; SL = Shootout Losses; GA = Goals Allowed; SO = Shutouts; GAA = Goals Against Average

Awards
Most Valuable Player - Jonathon Dew (Innisfil Lakers)
Top Scorer - Adam Palm (Bradford Rattlers)
Top Defenceman - Dave Malicek (Bradford Rattlers)
Top Goaltender - Daniel Jones (Richmond Hill Rams)
Top Forward - Sochiro Omi (Bradford Rattlers)
Rookie of the Year - Phil Grainger (Innisfil Lakers)
Most Heart - Brad Clark (Deseronto Storm)
Most Sportsmanlike Player - Andrew Quinn (Elliot Lake Bobcats)
Top Defensive Forward - Connor Hendry (Innisfil Lakers)
Coach of the Year - Ryan Leonard (Elliot Lake Bobcats)
Official of the Year - Ryan Harrison

See also 
 2007 in ice hockey
 2008 in ice hockey

References

External links 
 Official website of the Greater Metro Junior A Hockey League

GMHL
Greater Metro Junior A Hockey League seasons